Helen McKay was a dance band singer, active during the 1930s and 1940s. She was the first person to sing on the then high-definition standard (405 lines) in test transmissions by the BBC for the RadiOlympia Exhibition from 26 August to 5 September 1936. For the 26 August transmission (using the Baird 240 line system), McKay sang Here's Looking At You, written especially for the test transmissions by Ronnie Hill, accompanied solely by piano due to the limitations of the Baird system. For the 27 August transmission, McKay sang again, this time for the EMI 405 line system, accompanied by the BBC Television Orchestra. McKay gave an interview to The National Museum of Photography, Film and Television in 1986, in which she spoke about her experience.

During the 1930s, McKay was a vocalist in the Lew Stone dance band. In the 1940s McKay was a contributor to the war effort with ENSA concerts on the BBC Forces Programme. McKay was a member of the Debonaires, a quartet, including Alex Dore, Nadia Dore and Harry Brooker. The Debonaires sang with the Ambrose Orchestra, Felix Mendelssohn's Hawaiian Serenaders, Eric Winstone and his band, and also had a late night radio show.

In the 1950s, the personnel of the Debonaires changed to Nadia Dore, Bob Brown, Helen McKay and Bob Winette. McKay was to marry Bob Winnette, a singer, musician and songwriter. Together, they formed The Song Pedlars quartet.

References

Year of birth missing (living people)
Possibly living people
20th-century British women singers